Rusov or Russov is a Slavic male surname, its feminine counterpart is Rusova or Russova. Notable people with the surname include:

Dobrivoj Rusov (born 1993), Slovak association football player
Lev Russov (1926–1987), Russian painter, graphic artist, and sculptor

Slavic-language surnames